Park Won-sook (born January 19, 1949) is a South Korean actress.

Filmography

Television series

Film

Variety show

Music video

Theater

Books

Awards

References

External links
 
 
 

1949 births
Living people
South Korean television actresses
South Korean film actresses
Best Actress Paeksang Arts Award (television) winners